Mölder is an Estonian surname, an equivalent to the English Miller.

People with this surname include:
August Mölder (1914-1982), an Estonian-Australian artist who was part of the Six Directions collective
Jaan Mölder (born 1987), an Estonian rally driver
Maile Mölder (born 1977), an Estonian curler and curling coach
Raigo Mõlder (born 1982), an Estonian rally co-driver
Tõnis Mölder (born 1989), an Estonian politician and government minister

See also
Mölders (disambiguation)
Molder (disambiguation)

Estonian-language surnames